INS Magen is a  of the Israeli Navy. She is the first ship of her class to be commissioned.

Development and design 

The Sa'ar 6-class corvettes' design will be loosely based on the German , but with engineering changes to accommodate Israeli-built sensors and missiles such as the Barak 8 and the naval Iron Dome system. Elbit Systems has been awarded the contract to design and build the electronic warfare (EW) suites for the ships.

They are armed with an Oto Melara 76 mm main gun, two Typhoon Weapon Stations, 32 vertical launch cells for Barak-8 surface-to-air missiles, 40 cells for the C-Dome point defense system, 16 anti-ship missiles Gabriel V.  the EL/M-2248 MF-STAR AESA radar, and two  torpedo launchers. They have hangar space and a platform able to accommodate a medium class SH-60-type helicopter.

Construction and career 
She was laid down on 7 February 2018 and launched on 12 May 2019 at German Naval Yards and ThyssenKrupp in Kiel. She was handed over to Israeli Navy on 2 December and commissioned on 11 November 2020. In Haifa in September 2022, the vessel's 76/62 rapid-fire main gun was ceremonially accepted for her and her sister ship Oz.

Operational history 
In February 2022, the INS Magen took part in an exercise in the Mediterranean. Among other things, missile defense and unmanned vehicles were tested. During the exercise, training was given to repel missiles from Iran.

Gallery

References

2019 ships
Sa'ar 6-class corvettes